Atractus depressiocellus is a species of snake in the family Colubridae. The species can be found in Panama and Colombia.

References 

Atractus
Reptiles of Panama
Reptiles of Colombia
Reptiles described in 2003